Steven A. Adelson is an American film director and television director.

Filmography

Motherland: Fort Salem
Katy Keene
The Code
Siren
Dynasty
Riverdale
Training Day
Beyond
Scorpion
Sleepy Hollow
Sanctuary
Nikita
Haven
The Tomorrow People
The Lottery
Helix
Zoo
The Blacklist
The Player
Beauty & the Beast
Debris
Claws
SkyMed

Besides directing, Adelson worked as a camera operator on the films Jingle All the Way, The Players Club, the Christopher Nolan films Insomnia, Batman Begins, among others. He is alumnus of Syracuse University.

References

External links

American film directors
American television directors
Syracuse University alumni
Living people
Place of birth missing (living people)
Year of birth missing (living people)